The 2018 Massachusetts gubernatorial election took place on November 6, 2018, to elect the governor and lieutenant governor of the Commonwealth of Massachusetts. Republican Governor Charlie Baker and Lieutenant Governor Karyn Polito sought reelection to a second term in office, facing Democratic challengers Jay Gonzalez and Quentin Palfrey, respectively. Candidates were selected in the primary election held on September 4, 2018.

Shortly after polls closed at 8 p.m. local time, the Associated Press declared the race in favor of incumbents Baker and Polito. Shortly after 9 p.m. location time, Gonzalez conceded the election.

Baker was reelected with the highest vote total in the history of Massachusetts gubernatorial elections and by the widest margin since Bill Weld was reelected governor in 1994. He won many of the Commonwealth's most populated cities, including Worcester, New Bedford, and Springfield. Baker almost won Boston, losing it by only around 3,000 votes, an extraordinary showing for a statewide Republican candidate in a major city.

Background
Charlie Baker was elected in 2014 by a slim margin over then-Attorney General Martha Coakley; however, he has consistently rated as one of the most popular governors in the country. Some Democrats, including Congressman Mike Capuano and Speaker of the House Bob DeLeo publicly speculated they may vote for Baker over the eventual Democratic nominee. Speculated candidates such as Attorney General Maura Healey, Congressman Joe Kennedy, former State Senator Dan Wolf, and Boston Mayor Marty Walsh all declined to be candidates, leaving no prominent Democrats to challenge Baker, which was seen as a necessary prerequisite to mount a formidable challenge to him.

Because Evan Falchuk received more than 3% of the vote in the 2014 gubernatorial election, the United Independent Party gained official status. Falchuck had stated that he would "certainly" run for office in 2018. In 2016 however, the UIP lost its official party status after it failed to register 1% of Massachusetts voters as members. Evan Falchuk later left the UIP and registered as a Democrat in early 2017.

Republican primary
There was some concern amongst the Republican Party that Baker was too moderate, and talks of challenging him with a more conservative opponent in the primaries. GOP state committeeman Robert Cappucci told the Boston Herald that if Baker "shuns conservatives [...] there will be 100 percent an effort to try to find a conservative, viable candidate to challenge him in 2018 for governor". David Kopacz, the president of the Massachusetts Republican Assembly, also stated that Baker may face a conservative challenger in 2018.

Following his 2016 election, Barnstable County Commissioner Ron Beaty, who once was tried and convicted for threatening the life of President George H. W. Bush, has been making local and state headlines. He's proposed a "shark mitigation strategy" to combat the growing presence of sharks near Cape Cod beaches by baiting and shooting them, which was rejected for consideration by the commission chairman. He has also mulled a primary run against his state representative, Randy Hunt, after Hunt parked in his Barnstable County Courthouse parking spot. In September 2017 he announced he was in the process of changing the purpose of his campaign committee from a county to a statewide office. He cites the Governor's criticisms of President Donald Trump and his willingness to work with Democrats as his inspiration to run. On December 8, 2017, Scott Lively announced his campaign.

On December 13, 2017, Beaty stated he is no longer considering a run against Baker. Scott Lively, an evangelical pastor, challenged Baker and received more than the 15% of delegate votes necessary at the state convention to qualify for ballot access. Baker won the endorsement of the party by an overwhelming margin.

Baker ultimately won the nomination, but not without Lively securing over a quarter of the primary vote, leading to speculation that Baker's more moderate disposition and opposition to President Trump may have damaged his general election chances with Republican base voters.

Governor

Candidates

Declared
 Charlie Baker, incumbent governor
 Scott Lively, pastor and independent candidate for governor in 2014

Declined
 Ron Beaty, Barnstable County Commissioner (running for state representative, endorsed Lively)

Endorsements

Polling

Results

Convention

Primary

Lieutenant Governor

Candidates

Declared
 Karyn Polito, incumbent Lieutenant Governor

Results

Democratic primary

In November 2014, after interviewing over a dozen Democratic operatives, strategists, and activists, Joshua Miller of The Boston Globe wrote that the party would be looking for a young, fresh candidate who can appeal to the party's progressive base. He identified Attorney General Maura Healey as being "the first name on many Democratic lists". Samantha Lachman of The Huffington Post also identified Healey as a potential candidate for governor in 2018 or in a future United States Senate race.

As of July 2017, the declared candidates were relatively unknown to the state's voters. Their identification by Democratic voters was bolstered by addressing the 2017 state Democratic Convention, which saw its largest attendance of around 3,000 delegates in years.

On April 26, 2018, Setti Warren announced via Facebook that he was withdrawing from the race due to financial concerns. He stated he would not endorse either of his former opponents until the nomination is won.

At the Massachusetts Democratic Convention in June, party delegates endorsed Gonzalez and Palfrey, but Bob Massie and Jimmy Tingle also surpassed the 15% threshold for ballot access by comfortable margins. A poll from late June conducted by WBUR and MassInc. indicated that the contest for the Democratic nomination in the gubernatorial race is a toss-up, with Massie and Gonzalez being separated by a percentage smaller than the margin of error.

Gonzalez and Palfrey went on to win their respective nominations generously (winning almost every municipality in the state) and headed into the general election to face their Republican counterparts.

Governor

Candidates

Declared
 Jay Gonzalez, private health insurance executive, corporate lawyer, former State Secretary of Administration and Finance
 Bob Massie, co-founder of the Global Reporting Initiative, former executive director of Ceres, former president of the New Economy Coalition, ordained  Episcopal minister, nominee for lieutenant governor in 1994, candidate for the U.S. Senate in 2012

Withdrew
 Setti Warren, former mayor of Newton and candidate for the U.S. Senate in 2012

Declined
 Joe Avellone, businessman, former chairman of the Wellesley Board of selectmen and candidate for governor  in 2014
 Jeff Bussgang, venture capitalist and lecturer at Harvard Business School
 Katherine Clark, U.S. Representative (running for reelection)
 Evan Falchuk, founder and former chair of the United Independent Party and United Independent nominee for governor in 2014
 Maura Healey, Massachusetts Attorney General (ran for reelection)
 Joe Kennedy III, U.S. Representative (ran for reelection)
 John Kerry, former United States Secretary of State, former U.S. Senator, former lieutenant governor of Massachusetts and nominee for president in 2004
 Paul Mark, state representative (endorsed Jay Gonzalez)
 Marty Meehan, president of the University of Massachusetts System and former U.S. Representative
 Seth Moulton, U.S. Representative (ran for reelection)
 Marty Walsh, Mayor of Boston and former State Representative
 Dan Wolf, businessman and former state senator

Endorsements

Polling

Results

Lieutenant Governor

Candidates

Declared
 Quentin Palfrey, former senior advisor to the president for jobs & competitiveness
 Jimmy Tingle, humorist and activist

Declined 
 Paul Mark, state representative
 Patrick McDermott, Norfolk County Register of Probate
 Jon Mitchell, Mayor of New Bedford
 Matt O'Malley, Boston City Councilor
 Ayanna Pressley, Boston City Councilor (running for MA-7)

Endorsements

Results

General election

Debates
 Complete video of first debate, October 9, 2018
 Complete video of second debate, October 17, 2018
 Complete video of third debate, November 1, 2018

Endorsements
All individuals belong to the nominee's party unless otherwise specified.

Predictions

Polling

with Setti Warren

with Katherine Clark

with Maura Healey

with Joseph P. Kennedy III

with Bob Massie

with Seth Moulton

with Marty Walsh

Results

Results by county

See also
 2017–2018 Massachusetts legislature

References

External links
 Candidates at Vote Smart
 Candidates at Ballotpedia

Official campaign websites for gubernatorial candidates
 Charlie Baker (R) for Governor
 Jay Gonzalez (D) for Governor

Official campaign websites for lieutenant gubernatorial candidates
 Quentin Palfrey (D) for Lieutenant Governor

2018
Massachusetts
Gubernatorial